Robert Sutton was an Anglican priest in the late 19th and early  20th century.

He was born in 1832 and educated at Eton  and at Exeter College, Oxford. He was ordained in 1856 and was Curate of St Botolph's Aldgate then the incumbent of St Leonards, Aston Clinton until 1861. He held further posts at Westhampnett, Slinfold and Pevensey before being appointed Archdeacon of Lewes in 1888. He retired in 1908 and died two years later.

Notes

1832 births
People educated at Eton College
Alumni of Exeter College, Oxford
Archdeacons of Lewes
1910 deaths